The 2018 FIFA World Cup qualification UEFA Group B was one of the nine UEFA groups for 2018 FIFA World Cup qualification. The group consisted of six teams: Portugal, Switzerland, Hungary, Faroe Islands, Latvia, and Andorra.

The draw for the first round (group stage) was held as part of the 2018 FIFA World Cup Preliminary Draw on 25 July 2015, starting 18:00 MSK (UTC+3), at the Konstantinovsky Palace in Strelna, Saint Petersburg, Russia.

The group winners, Portugal, qualified directly for the 2018 FIFA World Cup. The group runners-up, Switzerland, advanced to the play-offs as one of the best eight runners-up.

Standings

Matches
The fixture list was confirmed by UEFA on 26 July 2015, the day following the draw. Times are CET/CEST, as listed by UEFA (local times are in parentheses).

Goalscorers
There were 82 goals scored in 30 matches, for an average of  goals per match.

15 goals

 Cristiano Ronaldo

9 goals

 André Silva

5 goals

 Ádám Szalai

4 goals

 Haris Seferovic

3 goals

 Valērijs Šabala
 Stephan Lichtsteiner

2 goals

 Ádám Gyurcsó
 João Cancelo
 William Carvalho
 Admir Mehmedi
 Ricardo Rodríguez
 Granit Xhaka
 Steven Zuber

1 goal

 Alexandre Martínez
 Marc Rebés
 Rógvi Baldvinsson
 Jóan Símun Edmundsson
 Sonni Nattestad
 Gilli Rólantsson
 Dániel Böde
 Balázs Dzsudzsák
 Zoltán Gera
 Richárd Guzmics
 Tamás Kádár
 Ádám Lang
 Roland Ugrai
 Gints Freimanis
 Dāvis Ikaunieks
 Igors Tarasovs
 Artūrs Zjuzins
 Bruno Alves
 João Moutinho
 Nélson Oliveira
 Eren Derdiyok
 Josip Drmić
 Blerim Džemaili
 Breel Embolo
 Fabian Frei
 Fabian Schär
 Xherdan Shaqiri
 Valentin Stocker

1 own goal

 Johan Djourou (playing against Portugal)

Discipline
A player was automatically suspended for the next match for the following offences:
 Receiving a red card (red card suspensions could be extended for serious offences)
 Receiving two yellow cards in two different matches (yellow card suspensions were carried forward to the play-offs, but not the finals or any other future international matches)

The following suspensions were served during the qualifying matches:

Notes

References

External links

Qualifiers – Europe: Round 1, FIFA.com
FIFA World Cup, UEFA.com
Standings – Qualifying round: Group B, UEFA.com

B
Portugal at the 2018 FIFA World Cup
Switzerland at the 2018 FIFA World Cup